Alvisi is a surname. Notable people with the surname include:

 Alessandro Alvisi (1887–1951), Italian horse rider
 (born 1977), Italian bicycle racer
 Lorenzo Alvisi, Italian computer scientist

Italian-language surnames